The Regional State Archives in Kristiansand is a regional state archives situated in Kristiansand, Norway. Part of the National Archival Services of Norway, it is responsible for archiving documents from state institutions in the counties of Aust-Agder and Vest-Agder. The collection includes ten shelf-kilometers of material from the 16th century to the 1990s. The archives have been at their current site since 1997, premises which are shared with the Intermunicipal Archives of Vest-Agder. The archives were established in 1934, taking over documents covering Agder from the Regional State Archives in Oslo.

References

National Archival Services of Norway
Organisations based in Kristiansand
1934 establishments in Norway
Government agencies established in 1934